Susana Saxlund (born 20 March 1957) is a Uruguayan former swimmer. She competed in two events at the 1972 Summer Olympics.

References

External links
 

1957 births
Living people
Uruguayan female swimmers
Olympic swimmers of Uruguay
Swimmers at the 1972 Summer Olympics
Place of birth missing (living people)